"Hot Girl Bummer" (stylized in lowercase) is a song by American recording artist Blackbear, released as a single through Beartrap on August 23, 2019, as the lead single from his fifth studio album Everything Means Nothing. It reached number 11 on the US Billboard Hot 100 and was certified quadruple platinum by the Recording Industry Association of America (RIAA).

Song title
Although the title was considered a play on Megan Thee Stallion's song "Hot Girl Summer", Blackbear claimed that it was not a parody and was instead a reference to the social media trend of using the hashtag "#hotgirlsummer".

Music videos
Two music videos were released for the song, blackbear - hot girl bummer [Low Budget Video] and blackbear - hot girl bummer [big budget music video]. Blackbear released the first music video on August 23, 2019, with the same day as the song's release. The music video consists of Blackbear surrounded by people at a party while sitting on a white couch, as well as being attached to strings and being moved in a puppet like manner by a man in a suit, which was called a "comment on people who are fake on social media".

The second music video was released on November 21, 2019, and features Blackbear appearing to be sitting on a skyscraper, on a couch, and dancing in a cage.

Commercial performance 
"Hot Girl Bummer" is Blackbear's second top 40 hit (as well as his third certified single), reaching number 11 in March 2020. It is also his highest-charting record to date, surpassing the number 40 peak of "Do Re Mi".

Composition and remix
The song contains a spoken line by Will Forte in Tim and Eric's Billion Dollar Movie.

On December 12, 2019, the song's remix was released along with Argentine rapper and singer Khea.

Personnel
Credits adapted from Qobuz.
Blackbear – producer, guitar, keyboards, programming 
Andrew Goldstein – producer, guitar, keyboards, programming
Alex Ghenea – mixer
Dave Kutch – mastering engineer

Charts

Weekly charts

Year-end charts

Certifications

Release history

References

2019 singles
2019 songs
Blackbear (musician) songs
Interscope Records singles
Songs written by Andrew Goldstein (musician)
Songs written by Blackbear (musician)